Catostomus conchos, the Matalote conchos, is a species of ray-finned fish in the family Catostomidae. It is found only in Mexico.

References

conchos
Freshwater fish of Mexico
Fish described in 1902
Taxonomy articles created by Polbot